The Port Arthur riot happened on July 15, 1919, in Port Arthur, Texas. Violence started after a group of white men objected to an African American smoking near a white woman on a street car. A "score" of whites and twice that number of African Americans battled in the streets leaving two seriously injured and dozens with minor injuries.

Aftermath

This uprising was one of several incidents of civil unrest that began in the so-called American Red Summer, of 1919. Terrorist attacks on black communities and white oppression in over three dozen cities and counties. In most cases, white mobs attacked African American neighborhoods. In some cases, black community groups resisted the attacks, especially in Chicago and Washington DC. Most deaths occurred in rural areas during events like the Elaine Race Riot in Arkansas, where an estimated 100 to 240 black people and 5 white people were killed. Also in 1919 were the Chicago Race Riot and Washington D.C. race riot which killed 38 and 39 people respectively, and with both having many more non-fatal injuries and extensive property damage reaching up into the millions of dollars.

See also

Washington race riot of 1919
Mass racial violence in the United States
List of incidents of civil unrest in the United States

Bibliography 
Notes

References 

 

Red Summer
African-American history between emancipation and the civil rights movement
White American riots in the United States
1919 riots in the United States
Racially motivated violence against African Americans
History of racism in Texas
July 1919 events
African-American history of Texas
Riots and civil disorder in Texas